is a village located in Nagano Prefecture, Japan. , the village had an estimated population of 4,688 in 1873 households, and a population density of 47 persons per km2.

Geography
Chikuhoku is located in the center of Nagano Prefecture in the Matsumoto Basin. Higashijo Dam and Onikuma Dam are located in Chikuhoku.

Climate
The village has a climate characterized by characterized by cool and humid summers, and cold winters (Köppen climate classification Dfa.  The average annual temperature in Chikuhoku is 9.6 °C. The average annual rainfall is 1227 mm with September as the wettest month. The temperatures are highest on average in August, at around 22.8 °C, and lowest in January, at around -3.0 °C.

Surrounding municipalities
Nagano Prefecture
 Matsumoto
 Azumino
 Nagano
 Chikuma
 Ueda
 Aoki
 Omi
 Ikusaka

Demographics 
Per Japanese census data, the population of Chikuhoku has decreased by more than half over the past 70 years.

History
The area of present-day Chikuhoku was part of ancient Shinano Province. Most of the area was under the control of Matsumoto Domain during the Edo period. The villages of Honjō, Sakakita, and Sakai were created with the establishment of the modern municipalities system on April 1, 1889. The village of Chikuhoku was incorporated on October 11, 2005, by a merger of the three villages.

Education
Chikuhoku has three public elementary schools and one public middle school operated by the village government, and one middle school operated jointly between Chikuhoku and neighboring Omi village. The village does not have a high school.

Transportation

Railway
  Shinano Railway - Shinano Railway Line
 -  -  -

Highway

Local attractions
Site of Aoyagi Castle
Mount Kamuriki, known in Japanese folklore as the location of Mount Ubasute

Notable people from Chikuhoku
Tomio Hora, historian

References

External links 

Official Website 

 
Villages in Nagano Prefecture